Abdullah Ramo Pazara was a Bosnian-American who was suspected of an association with the Islamic State of Iraq and the Levant (ISIL).

He was born a member of Bosnia's Muslim majority, near Teslić an area of Bosnia largely populated by Bosnian Serbs.  He was a youth during the brutal civil war that lead to Bosnia's independence from Yugoslavia.

Atlantic magazine described how the Vojska Republike Srpske, a Serbian militia, called upon non-Serbs to swear a loyalty oath to it.   They reported some Bosnian sources claimed Pazara was enlisted, as a child soldier, and fought with the Serbian VRS, against his own people. They  described  his upbringing as "shattering", and that he seemed to have failed to adapt to peacetime civilian life.

Pazara was born in Bosnia, and became an American citizen.  US intelligence officials describe him becoming radicalized, after he became an American citizen, and then traveled to Syria in July 2013, and volunteered to fight for ISIS.  However, according to the St Louis Post-Dispatch, Pazara was not naturalized until 2013. They described how he may have died there, but not before rising to a command position, and leading six other American ISIS followers to transfer funds to ISIS.  Ramiz Zijad Hodzic, Sedina Unkic Hodzic, Medy Salkicevic, Jasminka Ramic, Armin Harcevic, and Nihad Rosic, the six individuals described as his conspirators, all faced terrorism charges on February 7, 2015.  They too were all immigrants from Bosnia.

In 2017 the six alleged co-conspirators who faced charges for helping to fund Pazara's activities in Syria filed a motion  have their charges dropped, arguing he was a lawful combatant, fighting against Syria's Bashar al-Assad government, while enlisted with militia groups that operated with the support of the US.

References

Year of birth missing
2014 deaths
Bosnia and Herzegovina emigrants to the United States
Islamic State of Iraq and the Levant members